The Ashton to Tetonia Trail is a  rail-trail conversion built on the former Teton Valley Branch of the Union Pacific Railroad from Ashton to Tetonia, Idaho. The trail is used for hiking, biking, horseback riding, cross-country skiing, snowshoeing, and snowmobiling. Access points are found at Ashton, Marysville, Bitch Creek, Felt, and Tetonia. It is managed through Harriman State Park under administration by the Idaho Department of Parks and Recreation.

History
The trail occupies a portion of the former Teton Valley Branch of the Union Pacific Railroad. The original 46-mile line was constructed from 1910, beginning in Ashton, to 1912, when it was finished in Victor. The Ashton-Tetonia Trail opened to public in 2010 and spans about two-thirds of the length of the original line.

See also

 List of Idaho state parks
 National Parks in Idaho

References

External links
Ashton to Tetonia Trail Idaho Parks and Recreation 
Ashton to Tetonia Trail Map Idaho Parks and Recreation

State parks of Idaho
Protected areas of Fremont County, Idaho
Protected areas of Teton County, Idaho
Protected areas established in 2010